La Muette is a station on line 9 of the Paris Métro, in France, named after  the Chaussée de la Muette, a nearby street. The station opened on 8 November 1922 with the opening of the first section of the line from Trocadéro to Exelmans.

The Chaussée de la Muette is named after the Château de la Muette, which was converted from a hunting lodge to a small castle for Margaret of Valois, the first wife of King Henry IV of France. The meaning of the name of the hunting lodge is not known.  It may have derived from "muete", a spelling which appears frequently up to the end of the eighteenth century and which signifies a pack of deer-hounds (meute); it may have come from the "mues" or horns which stags shed in the autumn; or again from the "mue" or moulting-period of hunting hawks. The old château was demolished in the 1920s to make room for a wealthy housing estate. A new château was built nearby for Baron Henri James de Rothschild (1872–1947) in 1922.  This is now the headquarters for the Organisation for Economic Co-operation and Development.

Station layout

Gallery

Places of interest
Nearby are (closest first):
Jardin du Ranelagh
Organisation for Economic Co-operation and Development
Musée Marmottan Monet, a museum specialising in impressionist works, including a significant collection of paintings by Claude Monet and works by Berthe Morisot, Edgar Degas, Édouard Manet and Pierre-Auguste Renoir.
Bois de Boulogne

References 

Paris Métro stations in the 16th arrondissement of Paris
Railway stations in France opened in 1922